Queenstown Central is the central business district of Queenstown in the South Island of New Zealand. It also contains residential areas. The area contains Queenstown Primary and St Joseph's schools, and contained Wakatipu High School until it moved to Frankton at the beginning of 2018.

Skyline Queenstown operates a gondola and luge to and from Ben Lomond, with the gondola operating since 1967 and the luge since 1998.

Demographics

Queenstown Central had a population of 2,502 at the 2018 New Zealand census, an increase of 318 people (14.6%) since the 2013 census, and an increase of 297 people (13.5%) since the 2006 census. There were 651 households. There were 1,281 males and 1,215 females, giving a sex ratio of 1.05 males per female, with 156 people (6.2%) aged under 15 years, 1,203 (48.1%) aged 15 to 29, 1,053 (42.1%) aged 30 to 64, and 90 (3.6%) aged 65 or older.

Ethnicities were 60.2% European/Pākehā, 3.0% Māori, 0.7% Pacific peoples, 23.1% Asian, and 15.9% other ethnicities (totals add to more than 100% since people could identify with multiple ethnicities).

The proportion of people born overseas was 76.9%, compared with 27.1% nationally.

Although some people objected to giving their religion, 59.8% had no religion, 28.7% were Christian, 2.2% were Hindu, 2.0% were Buddhist and 4.0% had other religions.

Of those at least 15 years old, 549 (23.4%) people had a bachelor or higher degree, and 120 (5.1%) people had no formal qualifications. 162 people (6.9%) earned over $70,000 compared to 17.2% nationally. The employment status of those at least 15 was that 1,974 (84.1%) people were employed full-time, 159 (6.8%) were part-time, and 21 (0.9%) were unemployed.

References 

Suburbs of Queenstown, New Zealand
Populated places in Otago
Central business districts in New Zealand
Populated places on Lake Wakatipu